Der Mann ohne Schatten (The Man Without a Shadow) is a German television series.

External links
 

German crime television series
1996 German television series debuts
1996 German television series endings
German-language television shows
RTL (German TV channel) original programming